60 Arietis is a star in the northern constellation of Aries. 60 Arietis is the Flamsteed designation. It has an apparent visual magnitude of 6.14, making it a challenge to view with the naked eye. It is receding from the Earth with a heliocentric radial velocity of +24 km/s.

This object is an aging giant star with a stellar classification of K3 III, having exhausted the supply of hydrogen at its core and expanded to 11 times the Sun's radius. It is 5.3 billion years old with 1.36 times the mass of the Sun. The star shines with 49 times the Sun's luminosity; this energy is being radiated from the photosphere at an effective temperature of 4,449 K, giving it the orange-hued glow of a K-type star.

References

External links
 HR 1000
 Image 60 Arietis

K-type giants
Aries (constellation)
Durchmusterung objects
Arietis, 60
020663
015557
1000